Serge Robert (born 2 May 1963) is a French wrestler. He competed at the 1988 Summer Olympics and the 1992 Summer Olympics.

References

External links
 

1963 births
Living people
French male sport wrestlers
Olympic wrestlers of France
Wrestlers at the 1988 Summer Olympics
Wrestlers at the 1992 Summer Olympics
People from Bron
Sportspeople from Lyon Metropolis